Bunk is a comedy game show hosted by Kurt Braunohler on IFC in 2012. It was greenlit after being aired at the New York Television Festival. The show featured a rotating panel of three comedian contestants responding to comedic game show prompts in an improvised way.  Notable contestants included Dana Gould, Kumail Nanjiani, Eugene Mirman, and Alex Borstein.

During an appearance on The Best Show on WFMU with Tom Scharpling Braunohler announced that Bunk had been canceled.

References

External links
Bunk at IFC.com

2010s American sketch comedy television series
2012 American television series debuts
2012 American television series endings
English-language television shows
IFC (American TV channel) original programming
2010s American comedy game shows